The list of ship launches in 1806 includes a chronological list of some ships launched in 1806.


References

1806
Ship launches